Schoenobius gigantella is a species of moth of the family Crambidae. It is found in Europe and China (Heilongjiang, Neimenggu, Beijing, Tianjin, Hebei, Shanxi, Shandong, Henan, Xinjiang, Jiangsu, Hunan, Guangdong).

The wingspan is 25–30 mm for the males and 41–46 mm for the females. The moth flies from June to August depending on the location.

The larvae feed on Phragmites species and Glyceria maxima.

References

External links
 Waarneming.nl  
 Lepidoptera of Belgium 
 Schoenobius gigantella at UKMoths

Schoenobiinae
Moths of Europe
Moths described in 1775